Goran Ćurko (born 21 August 1968) is a Serbian former footballer who played as a goalkeeper.

After starting out in Yugoslavia, Ćurko spent the vast majority of his career in Germany. He played for seven German clubs for over a decade (1993–2003), collecting 183 appearances in the 2. Bundesliga.

Career
Born in Novi Sad, Ćurko made his Yugoslav First League debut with Vojvodina in the 1989–90 season. He also played for Mogren and Bečej in the Yugoslav Second League, before moving abroad to Germany.

In early 1993, Ćurko joined VfL Herzlake, spending two and a half years at the club. He subsequently played for 1. FC Nürnberg (1995–1997) and Tennis Borussia Berlin (1997–1999). After a brief spell at VfB Leipzig, Ćurko signed for Kickers Offenbach. He also spent half a season with Arminia Bielefeld. While playing for the club, in October 2000, Ćurko demonstratively left the pitch after conflicting with his own supporters during a home league game versus Waldhof Mannheim. He eventually switched to fellow Zweite Bundesliga's SSV Reutlingen in the 2001 winter transfer window.

After returning to his homeland, Ćurko played for ČSK Čelarevo in the Serbian First League. He was also a member of Proleter Novi Sad in 2010, aged 42, but failed to make any appearances.

Personal life
Ćurko also holds German citizenship. His son, Saša Ćurko, started out his footballing career playing as a forward for Vojvodina.

Career statistics

References

External links
 
 

1. FC Lokomotive Leipzig players
1. FC Nürnberg players
2. Bundesliga players
Arminia Bielefeld players
Association football goalkeepers
Expatriate footballers in Germany
FK ČSK Čelarevo players
FK Mogren players
FK Proleter Novi Sad players
FK Vojvodina players
Footballers from Novi Sad
Kickers Offenbach players
Naturalized citizens of Germany
OFK Bečej 1918 players
Regionalliga players
Serbia and Montenegro expatriate footballers
Serbia and Montenegro expatriate sportspeople in Germany
Serbia and Montenegro footballers
Serbian First League players
Serbian footballers
SSV Reutlingen 05 players
Tennis Borussia Berlin players
Yugoslav First League players
Yugoslav footballers
Yugoslav Second League players
1968 births
Living people